"Boy Blue" is a pop song written by Cyndi Lauper, Stephen Broughton Lunt, and Jeff Bova for Lauper's second album, True Colors (1986). It was released as the album's fourth single in 1987 (see 1987 in music). The single version is a remix. Charting at #71 on the Hot 100. Proceeds from the sale of the single were donated to AIDS organizations.

The official video was a live clip of the song in Paris, France and it was pulled from the concert video Cyndi Lauper in Paris. The video received heavy airplay on MTV when the single was released (during June and July 1987) and was rarely played after. A live version of "Boy Blue" was later released as the B-side of her single "Hole in My Heart (All the Way to China)".

Background
Thematically like "True Colors" on the album, Lauper wrote this song for a friend who died of AIDS, and the title comes from a poem by Eugene Field called "Little Boy Blue". This poem is based on a kid's story:

"Little Boy Blue"
          The little toy dog is covered with dust,
          But sturdy and staunch he stands;
          And the little toy soldier is red with rust,
          And his musket moulds in his hands;
          Time was when the little toy dog was new,
          And the soldier was passing fair;
          And that was the time when our Little Boy Blue
          Kissed them and put them there.
Here is what Cyndi says about this song:

"I tried to write about my friend. I knew he really loved 'That's What Friends Are For.' I know that maybe he would have liked me to do a song like that. Instead I wrote about him personally. I don't know that my lyrics were good enough, I don't know that anything was good enough. Maybe it was too personal. I don't know. But I wrote it for him. It was because of him that I keep trying to do stuff. And other friends. So many talented people, so many of our friends and so many gifted people have passed on. Or struggle everyday. Just to live. And it was because of my friends and others that I do this. Maybe that song wasn't good enough, I don't know."

When Lauper was asked about her intense live performance that was released as the video for the song, she responded:

"I used to cry every night when I sang that song. I was so mad. You know, you go through so much and I was so mad. I was mad that my friend was gone, I was mad at the way people treated me...We didn't know what the hell it was. We didn't know anything. Then all of a sudden it was out in the open and everyone was talking about it, but when he first told me about it I didn't understand. I didn't know. And then all of a sudden my friend was ill and ill and ill and then...It was so hard. I was so angry and every night I would sing my guts out, but you'd open your eyes after and it was the same. But sometimes, in a lot of ways, it was healing."

Music video

The official music video for the song was a live video clip pulled from the "Cyndi Lauper in Paris" home video cassette and HBO special.  It was directed by Andy Morahan.

Track listing
7"
 "Boy Blue" (Remix) – 3:58
 "The Faraway Nearby" – 2:57

12"
 "Boy Blue" (LP Version)
 "Time After Time"
 "The Faraway Nearby"

Charts

References

1987 songs
1987 singles
Cyndi Lauper songs
Epic Records singles
Music videos directed by Andy Morahan
Song recordings produced by Cyndi Lauper
Songs written by Cyndi Lauper
Songs written by Jeff Bova
Songs about HIV/AIDS